Kongsi is a 2011 Malaysian Malay-language action comedy film written by Farid Kamil and Fadzil Zahari. The film starring Shaheizy Sam, Fizo Omar and Yana Samsudin, tells of a murderer called Tumulak, who came to Malaysia to curb the Malaysian secret societies and relationships Tumulak with ASP Shariff. The movie was aired on May 12, 2011 and has created a record by recording a RM 1.1 million collection within 1 day of the show.

Plot
Tumulak, a murderer sent by his employer, Kimpedu, to curb the secret societies in Malaysia, especially in Kuala Lumpur. At that time, Kuala Lumpur was dominated by three secret societies, each led by Pak Maliki (leader of the Malay secret societies), Jimmy (leader of the Chinese secret societies) and Victor (chief secretary of India). Among the disruptions caused by Tumulak include killing the subordinates of Pak Maliki and Victor's son. This has attracted ASP Shariff's attention to investigate what happened.

Cast 
 Shaheizy Sam as Tumulak 
 Fizo Omar as ASP Shariff
 Yana Samsudin as Inspector Olla
 Azad Jasmin as Mikail 
 Bront Palarae as Kempedu 
 Piee as Pak Maliki
 K. Veerasingam as Victor
 Chew Kin Wah as Jimmy
 Alex Yanz as Robert
 Azlan Komeng as Rahim
 Putri Mardiana as Inspector Yati
 Shah Rempit as Radhi
 Farid Kamil as Chief of police

Reception

Box office
Having opened in 87 cinemas across Malaysia, The movie Kongsi has created history with successfully earning RM 1.08 million in one day. In the first week alone, the film managed to garner a collection of nearly RM7 million, As of June 15, 2011, about a month after the start of the show, Kongsi film scored RM 8.09 million.

References

External links

2011 films
Malay-language films
2011 action comedy films
Malaysian action comedy films